Sasd or SASD may refer to:

 Sásd, a town in Baranya county, Hungary
 Sheboygan Area School District
 Structure Analysis and Structured Design, a software development methodology
 Structured analysis / Structural design
 Souderton Area School District
 Stoughton Area School District